Hemidactylus albivertebralis is a species of gecko. It is endemic to West Africa and currently recorded from Guinea, Ivory Coast, Ghana, and Benin. It probably occurs more widely.

References

Hemidactylus
Reptiles described in 2012
Reptiles of West Africa
Fauna of Benin
Fauna of Ghana
Fauna of Ivory Coast